Canoeing and Kayaking at the 2007 Southeast Asian Games was held at the Map Prachan Reservoir of the Pattaya in Chon Buri Province, Thailand. The canoe-kayak schedule began on December 11 to December 14.

Medal tally

Medalists

Men

Women

External links
Southeast Asian Games Official Results

2007 Southeast Asian Games events